Kimara Lovelace is a female dance music vocalist from Somerville, New Jersey who placed three songs in the Top 10 of the Hot Dance Music/Club Play chart in the late nineties.  "Circles" spent a week at #1 in 1998. That same year, Kimara performed vocals on the songs "Ridge Racer -One More Win-" and "Urban Fragments" for the video game R4: Ridge Racer Type 4. Her follow-up single to "Circles" was "When Can Our Love Begin". Kimara also worked with music producer Lil Louis releasing a single "Misery" in 2000. Her other songs "Only You" charted at #5 and "I Luv You More" charted at #9 on Billboard Dance Club Song Play chart.

See also
List of number-one dance hits (United States)
List of artists who reached number one on the US Dance chart

References 

Living people
American women singers
American house musicians
American dance musicians
Year of birth missing (living people)
Place of birth missing (living people)
21st-century American women